James John Thomson (25 December 1851 – 23 July 1915) was a Scottish footballer who played in three international matches for Scotland. Thomson appeared in the first official international football match, a goalless draw with England, and also took part in the fixture in the two subsequent years. Like the majority of the earliest Scotland internationals, he played club football with Queen's Park, winning the inaugural edition of the Scottish Cup in 1874 as team captain, before relocating to London on business shortly afterwards.

See also
List of Scotland national football team captains

References

Scottish footballers
Scotland international footballers
Queen's Park F.C. players
1851 births
1915 deaths
People from Annan, Dumfries and Galloway
Association football defenders
Place of death missing